Poonchh is a village in the Indian state of Uttar Pradesh. It is situated in Moth Tehsil in the district of Jhansi, India

References

Villages in Jhansi district